Odi Gonzales (born 1962) is a Peruvian writer, translator and university professor. His literary works are written in Quechua and Spanish.

Life and career
Odi Gonzales was born in Calca, Peru (Cusco region). He studied literature in Peru and then obtained a master's degree at the University of Maryland, College Park. He currently teaches Quechua and Spanish at New York University.

He published in Spanish the poetry books Juego de niños (1988), Valle sagrado (1993), Almas en pena (1998) and La escuela de Cusco (2005). In 1992 Gonzales obtained  the César Vallejo National Poetry Prize and the Poetry Prize by National University of San Marcos in Lima. In 2002, he published Tunupa. El libro de las sirenas, a book with poems in Quechua. In 2000 Gonzales published a Spanish translation of the Quechua poetry book Taki parwa by Andrés Alencastre Gutiérrez. In 2019 he was an invited speaker at the literary Hay Festival in Arequipa.
 In 2014 some of his poems were translated into English by Lynn Levin, writer and instructor at the University of Pennsylvania.

Works

Poetry 
 La Escuela de Cusco (2005)
 Almas en Pena (1998)
 Valle Sagrado (1993)
 Juego de Ninos (1988)
 Tunupa: El Libro de las Sirenas (2002)
 Birds on the kiswar tree: poems (2014)

Translations 
 Kilku Warak'a (Andrés Alencastre Gutiérrez): Taki parwa. Biblioteca Municipal del Cusco, 2008.

External links 
 Penn Sound. Odi Gonzales: Reading Selected Poems (University of Pennsylvania, 2011)
 Festival Internacional de Poesía de Medellín. Odi Gonzales (Perú, Nación Quechua, 1962): Umantuu, Encantado
 Santiago Barcaza:  Odi Gonzales: poesía de lo múltiple (17 September 2018)

References 

Living people
Quechua-language poets
1962 births
Peruvian male poets
Peruvian translators
20th-century Peruvian poets
20th-century male writers
21st-century Peruvian poets
21st-century translators
21st-century male writers
People from Cusco Region
University of Maryland, College Park alumni
New York University faculty